was a city located in Sado Island, Niigata Prefecture, Japan.

On March 1, 2004, Ryōtsu and the other 9 municipalities in the island were merged to create the city of Sado. Since then, Ryōtsu has been one of the 10 subdivisions of Sado City.

As of 2003, the city had an estimated population of 16,710 and a density of 71.60 persons per km2. The total area was 233.37 km2.

History
The city was founded on November 3, 1954.

On March 1, 2004, Ryōtsu, along with the rest of Sado Island (the towns of Aikawa, Kanai, Sawata, Hatano, Mano, Hamochi and Ogi, and the villages of Niibo and Akadomari (all from Sado District)), was merged to create the city of Sado.

Transportation

Bus
 Niigata Kotsu Sado

Highway

Sea
 Ryōtsu Port 
 Sado Kisen Terminal
 Car ferry and Jetfoil services to/from Niigata Port

Local attractions
 Lake Kamo
 Onogame
 Futatsugame

Climate

See also
Sado, Niigata

References

External links
Sado Tourism Association 
Sado Steam Ship 
Sado Geopark 

Dissolved municipalities of Niigata Prefecture